Badā' (meaning: "revealing after concealing", or "alteration in the divine will") is a Twelver Shia Islamic concept regarding the Will of God. It refers to God revealing his will about a decision, wherein the people thought his will had already been made on that issue, as the Shia believe that God has knowledge of the ultimate outcome.

Most contemporary Twelvers are described as rejecting predestination. Instead, God may alter the course of human history as is seen to be fit. 

However some academics insist that Bada' is not rejection of predestination. 

Twelvers believe matters relating to the human destiny is of two kinds: definite and indefinite; God has power to change every thing which he wills and God's creativity is continuous.

Explanation of Bada’
The Shi’a concept of Bada’ can be thoroughly explained through the words of Ayatollah Morteza Motahhari (a disciple of Ayatollah Khomeini):

Furthermore, bada' does not occur in the knowledge of God (which is absolute and unchanging, and is described as "al-lawh al-mahfûz” – i.e. the protected tablet), it can only occur in the knowledge of humans and angels (which is not necessarily absolute, and is described as "lawhu 'l-mahw wa 'l-ithbat” – i.e. the tablet that can be erased and re-written). An example of this is stated by Imam Ali:

This last passage is significant; in it, although Imam 'Ali claims to have the access to 'ilmu 'l-ghayb (knowledge of the unseen) he acknowledges that it is totally dependent upon the will of Allah.

Examples

In the Quran
According to the Qur'an, God originally appointed thirty nights of worship for Moses, and later increased it to forty nights before granting him the Torah:

The wisdom behind the change in the length of appointment was only known afterwards, wherein the people took to disbelief:

The change from thirty nights to forty nights do not reflect a change in God's Knowledge, but only a change in the knowledge that Moses possessed.

During the life of Muhammad
The Muslims initially faced Jerusalem during their prayers, up until 17 months after the Hijra. Thereafter Muhammad was commanded to change the direction of prayers (Qibla) towards the Ka‘bah of the Sacred Mosque. The wisdom behind the change was also mentioned in the Quran:

The change once again reflects only a difference in the knowledge of Human beings.

Badā' with respect to Imāmate
An example of Bada' with Imamate is offered by three of the early Shia scholars:
 Kulayni in ‘al-Kafi,’ vol. 1, pg. 326, 328,
 Al-Shaykh Al-Mufid has narrations:
for - ‘al-Irshad,’ pg. 336-37
against - 
 Shaykh Tusi in ‘Al-Ghaybah,’ pg. 120, 122.

Narrations from these sources state that the Imāmates of Mūsā al-Kādhim and Hasan al-‘Askarī were given to them after the death of their siblings, who were originally supposed to be the Imāms. Due to these narrations, the belief among the Ismaili Shi’a that the Twelver Shi’a replaced Isma'il ibn Jafar with Musa al-Kadhim through the excuse of bada’, has been a point of criticism by the Ismailis against the Twelvers. However these narrations are rejected by Twelvers based on narrations from Muhammad, as well as narrations from the respective fathers of those Imāms, in which they were directly named as the successors to the Imāmate.

As well, even though Shaykh Tusi cited some of the traditions, he himself along with Shaykh Saduq were both opposed to the idea of Bada' with regards to Imāmate, arguing that if matters as important as Imāmate were subject to change, then the fundamentals of belief should also be subject to change. Muhammad Baqir Majlisi has also offered explanations of the concept of bada'.

Bada’ with respect to the Mahdi
In some traditions attributed to Imām Muhammad al-Baqir the number of the years which had to elapse before the emergence of the Mahdi was specified. For example, a close associate of Imam al-Baqir called Abu Hamzah Thabit ibn Dinar, recalled in the presence of Imam al-Baqir what Imam Ali had said about the end of the period of trial for the Shi’a after 70 years, which would be followed by a period of ease and comfort. Abu Hamza complained that the period had elapsed without the prophecy being fulfilled. Imam al-Baqir explained that God initially did set the time for the Mahdi's appearance at 70 years. However, when Husayn ibn Ali was killed the time was postponed to 140 years. This time span (of 140 years) was kept a secret and was only told to the close associates of the Imams. However, when the close associates revealed the time span to others, God delayed the appearance of the Mahdi for a further period. This time period is known only to God.

This hadith however, is not considered reliable by Shia scholars, based on the chain of narrators (isnad) of the tradition, and because there are no other people who have narrated this tradition. According to the isnad, one of the narrators in the chain would only have been one years old at the time when he heard the hadith.

Bada’ with respect to the foretold signs

According to the Twelver Shi’a, God has not Promised the occurrence of the foretold signs, and thus all such signs are subject to change due to God's new Decision (bada’). The traditions state that amongst all the signs there are few signs that are definite (i.e. it is unlikely that God changes His Will on their occurrence). Thus, they are very likely to take place before the advent of the Mahdi, as noted in the narration of Umar Ibn Hanzala:

Even for such definite signs God reserves bada’. God may change those of the definite Wills that are not categorized as His Sunan or His Promises. For instance, according to Twelvers, before the reappearance of the Mahdi, al-Sufyani would certainly rise. This is a definite Will, but it is not categorized as a promise. It is just an insisted future event meaning that it is unlikely that God cancels His Permission for the occurrence of this event, though it is still possible. According to the following tradition, God may make bada’ even in such insisted news. Dawud Ibn al-Qasim al-Ja'fari narrated:

Moreover, God may cancel the occurrence of the definite signs that were supposed to take place before the advent of the Mahdi.

The possibility of bada’ means the foretold signs are subject to change or cancellation. All the mentioned signs before the Mahdi's arrival, even if they finally occur, they may happen miraculously in an unpredictable manner. It is narrated:

Therefore, the Mahdi may reappear at any time and his reappearance may be hastened (or postponed) without need for the occurrence of any of the reported definite signs. This can occur by asking God to advance the Mahdi's reappearance from the bottom of one's heart, and hence God may make bada’ and advance his reappearance.

The existence of bada’ plays a central role in the Twelver way of expecting the Mahdi. According to Twelvers, by having faith in bada’, people would keep themselves ready all the time to receive the Mahdi. However, a person who has no faith in the alteration of the signs (due to bada’) and thinks of the reappearance of the Mahdi after the sighting of the signs is actually waiting primarily for the sighting of the signs and then for the Mahdi. Such an individual may deny the Mahdi if he reappears without the signs being fulfilled, as Abu Ubaida al-Hadhaa narrates:

See also
 Imamate
 Theology of Twelvers
 Kaysanites Shia
 Ghurabiyya Shia
 Criticism of Twelver Shia Islam's rejection of predestination

Footnotes

References

External links
Thiqat al-Islam Kulayni
'Kitab al-Irshad' by Al-Mufid
Shaykh Tusi
Ismael is replaced by Musa al-Kazim as Imam "Materials for the Study of the Babi Religion," pg.334
Expectation of the millennium, By Seyyed Vali Reza Nasr, Hamid Dabashi, pg.28-29 Shaykh Tusi and Shaykh Mufid's explanation of bada'

Shia theology